The Kathmandu Jazz Festival or Jazzmandu is an annual Jazz Festival, organised by Upstairs Ideas in Kathmandu, Nepal.
The festival's name is a portmanteau of Jazz and Kathmandu.

History
The festival's first edition included performances by the renowned Australian jazz and swing musician Don Burrows, UK singer Natalie Williams, and Australian Jazz/Funk outfit Afro Dizzi Act, who have since returned to Jazzmandu on several occasions.

Jazzmandu has built on its starting momentum to grow into an internationally recognized, week-long festival, celebrating its 10th anniversary in 2012. It has featured such renowned artists as legendary Indian percussionist Trilok Gurtu, and American jazz drummer Ari Hoenig.

Jazzmandu 2007 was cancelled due to political unrest and civil conflict in Nepal.

Jazz education in Nepal
Jazzmandu actively promotes music education in Nepal, organizing band competitions, workshops and master classes for young local musicians., and working closely with the Kathmandu Jazz Conservatory.

Jazzmandu 2012
Jazzmandu 2012 will run from November 1 to 7 and will feature American drummer Tito Puente, Jr., and Thai ensemble Rootman, among others.

References

Jazz festivals in Nepal
2002 establishments in Nepal